Verkhnyaya Lukina Gora is a rural locality (a village) in Gorodetskoye Rural Settlement, Kichmengsko-Gorodetsky District, Vologda Oblast, Russia. The population was 17 as of 2002.

Geography 
Verkhnyaya Lukina Gora is located 23 km northwest of Kichmengsky Gorodok (the district's administrative centre) by road. Nizhnyaya Lukina Gora is the nearest rural locality.

References 

Rural localities in Kichmengsko-Gorodetsky District